People's Artist of the Tajik SSR (Народный артист Таджикской ССР), is an honorary title awarded to citizens of the Tajik SSR in the Soviet Union. It is awarded for outstanding performance in the performing arts, whose merits are exceptional in the sphere of the development of the performing arts (theatre, music, dance, circus, cinema, etc.).

Partial list of recipients 
 Nikolay Akimov
 Aziza Azimova
 Savsan Bandishoeva
 Zahir Dusmatov
 Mu'tabar Ibrohimova
 Bozgul Isoeva
 Hashim Gadoev
 Mayram Isoeva
 Shoista Mullojonova
 Nuqra Rahmatova
 Nigina Raufova
 Sabzajon Shoismoilova
 Toji Sultonova
 Bashoratkhon Tojiboeva
 Sofia Tuibayeva
 Oydina Usmonova

See also 
 People's Artist of the USSR

References 

Tajik Soviet Socialist Republic
Honorary titles of the Soviet Union
People's Artists